Dream incubation is a thought technique which aims for a specific dream topic to occur, either for recreation or to attempt to solve a problem. For example, a person might go to bed repeating to themselves that they will dream about a presentation they have coming up, or a vacation they recently took. While somewhat similar to lucid dreaming, dream incubation is simply focusing attention on a specific issue when going to sleep.

Description
In a study at Harvard Medical School, Dr. Deirdre Barrett had her students focus on a problem, such as an unsolved homework assignment or other objective problem, before going to sleep each night for a week. She found that it was possible to come up with novel solutions in dreams that were both satisfactory to the dreamer and rated as objectively solving the problem by an outside observer. In her study, two-thirds of participants had dreams that addressed their chosen problem and one-third reached some form of solution within their dreams. Other studies have found this type of bedtime dream incubation effective in solving problems of a more subjective, personal nature. In Barrett's book, The Committee of Sleep, she describes her study of prominent artists and scientists who draw inspiration from their dreams. While most of these dreams occurred spontaneously, a small proportion of the respondents had discovered informal versions of dream incubation on their own. They reported giving themselves successful pre-sleep suggestions for everything from seeing finished artwork in their dreams to developing plots or characters for a novel to asking dreams to solve computing and mechanical design problems.

A 2010 article in Scientific American quotes Barrett summarizing a few of the incubations techniques from The Committee of Sleep as follows:

See also

 Lucid dream
 Works based on dreams

Further reading 
 G Delaney: Dream Research: Contributions to Clinical Practice,  2015

References

The Art of Scientific Investigation, William I.B. Beveridge, 1950, includes several instances of dream solutions.

Incubation